Fall Creek Township is one of nine townships in Hamilton County, Indiana, United States. As of the 2010 census, its population was 51,613 and it contained 17,542 housing units.

History
Fall Creek Township was organized in 1833.

Geography
The streams of Bee Camp Creek, Bills Branch, Britton Branch, Flatfork Creek, High Ditch, Lowery Creek, Mount Zion Branch, Mud Creek, Sand Creek, Thorpe Creek, Thor Run, and William Lehr Ditch run through this township.

Cities and towns
 Noblesville (southeast and far east edges of Noblesville)
 Fishers (east half of Fishers)

Adjacent townships
 Wayne Township (north)
 Green Township, Madison County (east)
 Vernon Township, Hancock County (southeast)
 Lawrence Township, Marion County (southwest)
 Delaware Township (west)
 Noblesville Township (northwest)

Cemeteries
The township contains eight cemeteries: Arnett, Bethlehem, Brooks, Helm, Highland, Lowery, McKay and Mount Zion.

Major highways
 Interstate 69
 State Road 238

Education
Fall Creek Township residents may obtain a free library card from the Hamilton East Public Library in Noblesville.

References
 
 United States Census Bureau cartographic boundary files

External links

Townships in Hamilton County, Indiana
Townships in Indiana